Lawrence Edward Junstrom (June 22, 1949 – October 5, 2019) was an American bassist, best known for having been in the rock band .38 Special from 1977 until 2014. He was also one of the founding members of the Southern rock band Lynyrd Skynyrd.

Biography
Junstrom was the bass guitarist of Lynyrd Skynyrd from its formation in 1964, until he was replaced by Greg T. Walker in 1971. Donnie Van Zant, the younger brother of the Lynyrd Skynyrd leader, Ronnie Van Zant, formed .38 Special in 1974, with Junstrom joining as the bass guitarist in 1977.

An avid amateur radio operator, he had the call letters K4EB, which translate to "Known 4 Excellent Bass".

Junstrom retired from .38 Special in 2014, due to a hand injury which required surgery. He died on October 5, 2019, at the age of 70.

References

1949 births
2019 deaths
American rock bass guitarists
American male bass guitarists
Lynyrd Skynyrd members
38 Special (band) members
Musicians from Pittsburgh
Guitarists from Pennsylvania
20th-century American guitarists
Blues rock musicians